Charles VIII (1408–1470), contemporaneously known as Charles II and called Charles I in Norwegian context, was king of Sweden (1448–1457, 1464–1465 and 1467–1470) and king of Norway (1449–1450).

Regnal name
Charles was the second Swedish king by the name of Charles (Karl). Charles VIII is a posthumous invention, counting backwards from Charles IX (r. 1604–1611) who adopted his numeral according to a fictitious history of Sweden. Six others before Charles VII are unknown to any sources before Johannes Magnus's 16th century book , and are considered his invention. Charles was the first Swedish monarch of the name to actually use a regnal number as Charles II (later retrospectively renumbered VIII), on his wife's tombstone (1451) at Vadstena.

Early life
Karl Knutsson was born in October 1408 or 1409, at Ekholmen Castle, the son of Knut Tordsson (Bonde), knight and member of the privy council (riksråd), and Margareta Karlsdotter (Sparre av Tofta), the only daughter and heiress of Charles Ulvsson, Lord of Tofta. His father Knut was first cousin of Erik Johansson Vasa's father. His first marriage, in 1428, to Birgitta Turesdotter (Bielke) (died 1436) gave him his daughter Christina. His second marriage, in 1438, to Catherine (Gumsehuvud, died in 1450) produced his second daughter Magdalena, who married Ivar Axelsson (Tott). He also had two children by his third wife (and former mistress) Christina Abrahamsdotter, Anna and Karl. His father was said by contemporary legends to descend from a younger brother of King Eric IX (Saint Eric). His mother, an important heiress, descended from Jarl Charles the Deaf and consequently from some ancient Folkunge earls of Sweden, as well as from Ingegerd Knutsdotter, a daughter of Canute IV of Denmark and Adela of Flanders.

Growing influence
In 1434 he became a member of the Privy Council of Sweden and in October of the same year he assumed one of its most senior offices, Lord High Constable of Sweden, or Riksmarsk. Because of the growing dissatisfaction with King Eric of Pomerania among the Swedish nobility, Charles was in 1436 made Rikshövitsman, an office equating to Military Governor of the Realm, and finally replaced the king as an elected regent from 1438 to 1440, as the result of the rebellion by Engelbrekt Engelbrektsson. During Charles's brief regentship, the so-called Rebellion of David (a peasant rebellion) took place in Finland. Eric of Pomerania was forced to step down from the throne and in 1440 Christopher of Bavaria, was elected king of Sweden, Norway and Denmark. At the coronation of Christopher in September 1441, Charles was dubbed a knight and appointed Lord High Justiciar of Sweden, or Riksdrots. In October he resigned as Lord High Justiciar and resumed his office as Lord High Constable. From 1442 he was the military governor, hövitsman, at Vyborg in Finland (margrave of Viborg).

Charles acquired extensive fiefs, for example in Western Finland. His first seat was in Turku. Soon, Christopher's government began to take back fiefs and positions and Charles was forced to give up the castle of Turku. Charles's next seat was the castle of Vyborg, on Finland's eastern border, where he kept an independent court, taking no heed of Christopher and exercising his own foreign policy in relation to such powers in the region as the Hanseatic League, the Russian city of Novgorod and the Teutonic Knights in what are today Estonia and Latvia.

King of Sweden and Norway

At the death of Christopher in 1448, without a direct heir, Charles was elected king of Sweden on 20 June and on 28 June he was hailed as the new monarch at the Stones of Mora, not far from Uppsala, mostly due to his own military troops being present at the place, against the wishes of regents Bengt and Nils Jönsson (Oxenstierna). The Danish had in September 1448 elected Christian I as their new monarch. A rivalry ensued between Charles and Christian for the throne of Norway, which had also been ruled by Christopher, with both kings gaining support from various factions in the Norwegian Council of the realm. In 1449 a portion of the Norwegian council elected Charles King of Norway, and he was crowned in Nidaros Cathedral in Trondheim on 20 November. However, Christian also continued pursuing his claim to Norway. The Swedish aristocracy was reluctant to back Charles in a war against Denmark over Norway, and already in June 1450, Charles was forced to relinquish the throne of Norway in favour of Christian.

From 1451, Sweden and Denmark were in state of war against each other. Because of devastating warring, a growing opposition against Charles emerged among the nobility in Sweden. The strongest opponent was the Swedish church which opposed Charles's efforts to concentrate royal and secular power. Other opponents were the family group of Oxenstierna and the House of Vasa, which had been on the opposing side in the election of king and lost.

Later reigns
During the next 20 years, Charles was deposed twice, only to regain the throne and reign three times (1448–1457, 1464–65, 1467–1470).

In 1457, a rebellion took place, led by Archbishop Jöns Bengtsson (Oxenstierna) and a nobleman, Erik Axelsson Tott. Charles went into exile to Danzig (Gdańsk). The two leaders of the revolt took the regentship, and organized the election of Christian I of Denmark as king (firstly in Turku, then in Stockholm).

In 1463, King Christian quarrelled with the Archbishop because of his taxation policies. The Archbishop was imprisoned, which resulted in a rebellion by his relatives, and led to Christian being driven out of Sweden. Charles was recalled by the rebels and returned at the head of a force of German and Polish mercenaries. Upon arrival in Sweden he found himself at war with the Archbishop and after two bloody battles in the winter of 1464–1465 Charles was again exiled. In 1467, the regent Erik Axelsson Tott, now having reverted to support Charles, once more had him crowned. Charles then reigned for three years, sharing power with the Riksråd, until his death in Stockholm in May 1470.

Family

With his wife Birgitta Turesdotter (Bielke), Charles had:
 Ture Karlsson (Bonde) (died young before 1447)
 Christina Karlsdotter (Bonde) (c. 1432 – before 1500), married 1446 to the noble, councillor, and courtier Erik Eriksson (Gyllenstierna)

With his wife Catherine, Charles had:
 Margaret Karlsdotter (Bonde) (1442–1462)
 Magdalena of Sweden (1445–1495), married to noble Ivar Axelsson (Tott) in 1466
 Richeza Karlsdotter (Bonde) (born c. 1445), nun at Vadstena Abbey
 Bridget Karlsdotter (Bonde) (1446–1469), nun at Vadstena Abbey
 four sons died early

With his mistress Christina Abrahamsdotter, Charles had:
 Anna Karlsdotter (Bonde), married to the noble Håkan Svensson (Bölja), governor of Västerås castle.
 Charles Karlsson (Bonde) (1465–1488)

Charles was survived by only one son, born of Christina Abrahamsdotter, whom he married on his deathbed. Though she was recognized as queen, the Swedish government did not allow the suddenly legitimized boy to succeed him, but appointed one of their number, Sten Sture the Elder (who was Charles's nephew), as regent.

Legacy
Charles represented a growing nationalist tendency among the Swedish aristocracy which tried first to subjugate the other Scandinavian countries under Sweden but soon focused on dissolving the Kalmar Union. In the next century, when the union was finally dissolved, Charles received some respect as an early champion of Swedish independence.

Charles's fight for power and kingship was more successful than his experience thereof. He allegedly recognized this himself and described his life in a brief poem:

When I was Lord of Fågelvik, (pronounced: foegle-veek)
Then I had wealth and might unique.
But once I was King of the Swedish land,
I was a poor and unhappy man.

Charles's great-granddaughter Christina Nilsdotter Gyllenstierna was married to Sten Sture the Younger whose regentship represented similar values: nationalism and Swedish independence.

Though the Bonde family, not descendants of Charles himself but just his collateral relatives, remained prominent among the Swedish nobility and in politics into the 20th Century, Charles's own descendants did not ascend nor inherit any thrones until Prince Christian zu Schleswig-Holstein-Sonderburg-Glucksburg became Christian IX of Denmark in 1863.  Charles's descendants have since ascended the thrones of Norway, Greece and Great Britain, Brunswick, Luxembourg, Belgium, Spain, Romania and Russia Empire together with Grand Duchy of Finland. Nicholas II was the first direct descendant on the Finnish throne.

His distant direct descendant, Sibylla of Saxe-Coburg-Gotha married the Hereditary Prince of Sweden in the 20th century, and with Sibylla's son, king Carl XVI Gustav of Sweden, Charles's blood returned to the Swedish throne.

References

External links

1409 births
1470 deaths
15th-century Swedish monarchs
15th-century Norwegian monarchs
Monarchs who abdicated
Rulers of Finland
Kalmar Union
People of medieval Finland
Burials at Riddarholmen Church